Miguel A. Pereira Castillo (born September 26, 1947) is a Puerto Rican politician, attorney, and public servant. Throughout his career, he has served in various government positions like Director of the Puerto Rico Ports Authority, Superintendent of the Puerto Rico Police Department and Secretary of the Puerto Rico Department of Corrections and Rehabilitation. In 2012, he was elected to the Senate of Puerto Rico for the District of Guayama.

He is married to Public Relations Practitioner, Annie Bird.

Early years and studies
Miguel Pereira Castillo was born on September 26, 1947 in Cayey, Puerto Rico. His parents were two schoolteachers, Miguel and Gilda. Pereira studied in Puerto Rico public school system, obtaining his high school diploma from the Benjamin Harrison High School in his hometown.

In 1964, Pereira enrolled in the University of Puerto Rico in Río Piedras to complete a Bachelor's degree in psychology. While studying there, he had his first military experience with the Reserve Officers' Training Corps (ROTC). Pereira graduated in 1968 in the middle of the Vietnam War.

Military and professional career
After graduating, Pereira joined the United States Air Force and became a rescue helicopter pilot during the Vietnam War. During that time, he accrued more than 1,000 flight hours. He also received a shot on his right arm for which he received a Purple Heart. He would later receive a Silver Star as well.

After five years, Pereira earned a scholarship to study law at Hofstra University in New York. After passing the bar exam, he returned to the Air Force at the United States Air Force Judge Advocate General's Corps. After that, he started working for the United States Department of Justice in Washington, D.C. He worked as a district attorney for 12 years.

Public service
In 2001, Governor of Puerto Rico Sila Calderón appointed Pereira as Executive Director of the Puerto Rico Ports Authority. However, on 2002, Calderón put Pereira in charge of the Puerto Rico Police Department. The next year, Pereira swapped positions with Víctor Rivera González, which left him as Secretary of the Puerto Rico Department of Corrections and Rehabilitation.

When Aníbal Acevedo Vilá won the 2004 elections, he left Pereira in charge of the Department of Corrections. Pereira occupied the seat for the next four years, finishing his term on January 1, 2009. During his tenure, Pereira promoted the medication of drug addicts treating them as sick people instead of delinquents.

Political career
On October 29, 2011, Pereira presented his candidacy to the Senate of Puerto Rico with the Popular Democratic Party (PPD). He decided to run for the District of Guayama because he was "born, raised, and educated in it." In March 2012, he was the candidate with most votes within his district during the PPD primaries. After the general elections, Pereira resulted victorious earning a seat in the Senate.

Military awards
  Silver Star
  Purple Heart
  Airman's Medal
  National Defense Service Medal with 1 service star
  Vietnam Service Medal
  Air Force Longevity Service Award
  Vietnam Campaign Medal

References

1947 births
Living people
United States Air Force personnel of the Vietnam War
Hofstra University alumni
Members of the Senate of Puerto Rico
People from Cayey, Puerto Rico
Puerto Rican military officers
Puerto Rican United States Air Force personnel
Recipients of the Silver Star
Recipients of the Airman's Medal
Superintendents of the Puerto Rico Police
United States Air Force officers
University of Puerto Rico alumni